Mars Ravelo's Dyesebel is a 2014 Philippine fantasy-drama television series based on a famous graphic novel Dyesebel created by Mars Ravelo. Directed by Don M. Cuaresma and Francis E. Pasion, it is topbilled by Anne Curtis, together with an ensemble cast. The series was aired on ABS-CBN and worldwide on TFC from March 17, 2014 to July 18, 2014, after 87 episodes. It is the tenth television drama in the Philippines made by ABS-CBN filmed in high definition. The story follows the journey of a young mermaid named Dyesebel, as she discovers the world above the ocean and locks in a fierce love triangle.

Series overview and ratings

{| class="wikitable plainrowheaders" style="text-align: center;"
|- class="wikitable" style="text-align: center;"
! style="padding: 0 8px;" colspan="2"| Month
! style="padding: 0 8px;" | Episodes
! style="padding: 0 8px;" | Peak
! style="padding: 0 8px;" | Average Rating
! style="padding: 0 8px;" | Rank
! style="padding: 0 8px;" | Source
|-
|style="padding: 0 8px; background:#F88017;"| 
| ' style="padding: 0 8px;" |March 2014
|  style="padding: 0 8px;"|11
|  style="padding: 0 8px;"|33.1% (Episodes 4 and 11)
|  style="padding: 0 8px;"|32.2%
|  style="padding: 0 8px;"|#3
|  style="padding: 0 8px;"|
|-
|style="padding: 0 8px; background:#2950BB;"| 
| ' style="padding: 0 8px;" |April 2014
|  style="padding: 0 8px;"|20
|  style="padding: 0 8px;"|33.3% (Episode 14)
|  style="padding: 0 8px;"|29.5%
|  style="padding: 0 8px;"|#1
|  style="padding: 0 8px;"|
|-
|style="padding: 0 8px; background:#B60000;"| 
| ' style="padding: 0 8px;" |May 2014
|  style="padding: 0 8px;"|22
|  style="padding: 0 8px;"|34.9% (Episode 47)
|  style="padding: 0 8px;"|30.6%
|  style="padding: 0 8px;"|#2
|  style="padding: 0 8px;"|
|-
|style="padding: 0 8px; background:#366413;"| 
| ' style="padding: 0 8px;" |June 2014
|  style="padding: 0 8px;"|21
|  style="padding: 0 8px;"|32.8% (Episode 60)
|  style="padding: 0 8px;"|31.0%
|  style="padding: 0 8px;"|#2
|  style="padding: 0 8px;"|
|-
|style="padding: 0 8px; background:#FDD017;"| 
| ' style="padding: 0 8px;" |July 2014
|  style="padding: 0 8px;"|13
|  style="padding: 0 8px;"|31.4% (Episode 78)
|  style="padding: 0 8px;"|27.2%
|  style="padding: 0 8px;"|#2
|  style="padding: 0 8px;"|
|-
|}

Episodes

 No = Overall episode number
 Ep = Episode number by month
The show was originally planned to have 185 episodes, and was originally set to run until November 2014. However, it ended with an incomplete storyline on July 18, 2014, with only 88 episodes produced, and 87 were aired (two produced episodes were merged into a single special for the series finale).

March 2014

April 2014

May 2014

June 2014

July 2014

Preempted Episodes
April 17, 2014 - This episode has been preempted in observance of Lent.
April 18, 2014 - This episode has been preempted in observance of Lent.
July 16, 2014 - This episode has been preempted due to technical failure caused by Typhoon Glenda.

References

External links
 

Dyesebel
Lists of fantasy television series episodes
Lists of Philippine drama television series episodes